There are several national data protection authorities across the world, tasked with protecting information privacy. In the European Union and the EFTA member countries, their status was formalized by the Data Protection Directive and they were involved in the Madrid Resolution.

This project is a part of the work of the International Law Commission of the United Nations.

Authorities by group of states
 On the European level, it is the G29 and the European Data Protection Supervisor (EDPS). The process was backed in 2005 by the Council of Europe, during the World Summit on the Information Society (Tunis, November 2005), and in 2006/2007 within forums on Internet governance (Athens 2006, Rio 2007).
 On 12 June 2007, OECD recommendation regarding "trans-frontier cooperation for legislations protecting privacy enforcement" was adopted. It aimed in particular to "improve national Privacy law enforcements so that national authorities can better cooperate with foreign authorities and put in place efficient international mechanisms to ease trans-frontier cooperation for legislations protecting privacy enforcement".
 An Ibero-American network of data protection exists. In May 2008, during its 6th meeting, in Colombia, its declaration asking international conferences on data protection and privacy to "pursue their efforts, regardless of their geographical location, in order to adopt common legal instruments".
 Another network is that of the Central and Eastern data protection authority (CEDPA). This network has expressed its will to pursue and strengthen its activities within the CEDPA, notably to elaborate common solutions and assist new members with the establishment of data protection legislation. That was during the June 2008 meeting in Poland.

List of national data protection authorities

European Economic Area
 : Austrian Data Protection Authority
 : Belgian Data Protection Authority, also known as APD-GBA
 : Bulgarian Data Protection Authority
 : Office of the Commissioner for Personal Data Protection
 : Office for Personal Data Protection
 : Danish Data Protection Agency
 : Estonian Data Protection Inspectorate
 : Office of the Data Protection Ombudsman
 :  (lit. 'National Commission on Informatics and Liberty'), also known as CNIL
 : Federal Commissioner for Data Protection and Freedom of Information
 Note: Competent supervisory authorities for the enforcement of data protection in the private sector are the respective state authorities.
 : Hellenic Data Protection Authority, also known as HDPA
 : Hungarian National Authority for Data Protection and Freedom of Information
 : Data Protection Authority
 : Data Protection Commissioner, also known as DPC
 : Italian Data Protection Authority, also known as Italian DPA
 : Data State Inspectorate
 : Datenschutzstelle
 : State Data Protection Inspectorate
 : National Commission for Data Protection, also known as CNPD
 : Office of the Information and Data Protection Commissioner, also known as IDPC
 : Dutch Data Protection Authority
 : Norwegian Data Protection Authority
 : Polish Data Protection Commissioner
 : National Commission Data Protection, also known as NCDP
 : National Authority for the Supervision of Personal Data Processing, also known as ANSPDCP
 : Office for Personal Data Protection of the Slovak Republic
 : Information Commissioner of the Republic of Slovenia
 : Spanish Data Protection Agency
: Transparency and Data Protection Council of Andalusia
 : Basque Data Protection Authority
 : Catalan Data Protection Authority
 : Swedish Data Protection Authority, also known as Swedish DPA
 : Information Commissioner's Office, also known as ICO

Europe
 : Information and Data Protection Commissioner (IDP) (Komisionerit për të Drejtën e Informimit dhe Mbrojtjen e të Dhënave Personale (KDIMDP))
 : Data Protection Agency of Andorra
 : Croatian Personal Data Protection Agency
 : Personal Data Protection Service
 : Data Protection Office
 : Directorate for Personal Data Protection
 : Office of the Data Protection Supervisor
 : Commission de contrôle des informations nominatives (lit. 'Personal Data Control Board'), also known as CCIN
 : Federal Service for Supervision in the Sphere of Telecom, Information Technologies and Mass Communications (Roskomnadzor)
 : Commissioner for Information of Public Importance and Personal Data Protection
 : Federal Data Protection and Information Commissioner, also known as FDPIC
 : Turkish Data Protection Authority
 : Ukrainian Parliament Commissioner for Human Rights

Africa
 : Data Protection Agency, known as APD
 : No national authority is responsible for data protection.
 : Data Protection Commission
 : Commission nationale de contrôle de la protection des données à caractère personnel (lit. 'National Commission for the Control of the Protection of Personal Data'), also known as CNDP
 : No national authority is responsible for data protection.
 : National Information Technology Development Agency (NITDA) and Nigerian Communications Commission (NCC) provide services regarding data protection.
 : Information Regulator
 : National Authority for Protection of Personal Data, known as INPDP
 : There is currently no data protection authority but the Zimbabwe Media Commission comments on the degree of protection of privacy from public bodies programs.

Asia
 : Cyberspace Administration of China (CAC)
 : Office of the Privacy Commissioner for Personal Data (PCPD)
 : No national authority is responsible for data protection.
 : Personal Data Protection Authority Institute
 : The Privacy Protection Authority
 : Personal Information Protection Commission (Japan) (PPC)
 : Data protection is regulated by the state.
 : Office for Personal Data Protection, known as OPDP
 : There is a Personal Data Protection Commissioner
 : No national authority is responsible for data protection.
 : National Privacy Commission
 : Qatar Ministry of Transport and Communications
 : No national authority is responsible for data protection.
 : A Personal Data Protection Commission is created following the Personal Data Protection Act 2012 (Singapore)
 : Personal Information Protection Commission (South Korea) (PIPC)
 : No national authority is responsible for data protection.
 : Office of the Personal Data Protection Committee
 : No national authority is responsible for data protection.
 : Regulators for data protection are sector-specific.

Oceania
 : Office of the Australian Information Commissioner
 : Privacy Commissioner (New Zealand)

North America
 : Office of the Privacy Commissioner of Canada
 : National Institute of Transparency for Access to Information and Personal Data Protection
 : There is no single national authority.

South America
 : Dirección Nacional de Protección de Datos Personales (lit. 'National Directorate for Personal Data Protection'), known as PDP
 : No national authority is responsible for data protection.
 : National Data Protection Authority (ANPD)
 : There is no dedicated authority.
 : Superintendency of Industry and Commerce (SIC)
 : Agency for the Protection of Individual's Data, known as PRODHAB
 : No national authority is responsible for data protection.
 : National Civil Registry and Institute for the Access to Public Information
 : No national authority is responsible for data protection.
 : Ministerio de Justicia y Derechos Humanos (Perú) (lit. 'Ministry of Justice and Human Rights')
 : Personal Data Control and Regulatory Unit.
 : No national authority is responsible for data protection.

See also

General aspects
Behavioural targeting
Biometric Information Privacy Act
CNIL
Cookies (Internet)
Data security
Database
Digital identity
Geolocation Privacy and Surveillance Act
Health data
Identity (psychology)
Identity (social science)
Information leakage
Information security
Obfuscation
On the Internet, nobody knows you're a dog
Passenger name record
Social web
User profile
Violation of privacy

Technical aspects
Digital certificate
OpenID
Strong authentication
:Category:Identity management

Legal aspects
Escrow
Identity document
Identity theft
Personal identity verification
Protection Profile

References

External links
 List of national data protection authorities in Europe
 International Conference of Data Protection and Privacy Commissioners
 Handbook on European data protection law
 Comparison of data protection laws around the world

 
Information privacy